Belly River is a river in northwest Montana, United States and southern Alberta, Canada. It is a tributary of the Oldman River, itself a tributary of the South Saskatchewan River.

The river was previously referred to as Mokowan River.

The river gives the name to the Cretaceous age Belly River Formation, which was observed on its banks by George Mercer Dawson in 1883.

Course
The Belly River originates in northwestern Montana at Helen Lake, near the base of Ahern Peak in Glacier National Park. It flows north across the 49th parallel north into Alberta near Chief Mountain, in the east of the Waterton Lakes National Park. It continues north, crossed by Highway 6 and Highway 5, passes near the communities of Hill Spring and Glenwood, then turns northeast. It is crossed by Highway 2 north of Stand Off, then continues north along the base of the Mokowan Ridge, where it receives the waters of the Waterton River.

Tributaries
From spring to mouth, the Belly River receives the following tributaries:
North Belly River
Mami Creek
Dipping Vat Lake
Bullhorn Coulee
Layton Creek
Waterton River
McNab Coulee

See also

List of rivers of Alberta
List of rivers of Montana
Montana Stream Access Law

References

Rivers of Alberta
International rivers of North America
Rivers of Glacier County, Montana